Sumiyaa is a Mongolian given name. Notable people with the name include:

Dorjsürengiin Sumiyaa (born 1992), Mongolian judoka
Erdenechimegiin Sumiyaa (born 1990), Mongolian wrestler

Mongolian given names